Pteridine is an aromatic chemical compound composed of fused pyrimidine and pyrazine rings. A pteridine is also a group of heterocyclic compounds containing a wide variety of substitutions on this structure.  Pterins and flavins are classes of substituted pteridines that have diverse biological roles.

See also
 Dihydrobiopterin
 Pyrazine
 Pyrimidine
 Tetrahydrobiopterin

References